Malanga is a 1986 Pakistani Punjabi-language action and musical film directed by Rasheed Dogar. It was produced by M. Hussain Dogar with Shah Productions and stars Anjuman, Sultan Rahi, Mustafa Qureshi, Afzaal Ahmad and the duo (Tariq Shah - Ilyas Kashmiri).

Synopsis 
The protagonist, Sultan Rahi, receives money from several large investors and the movie follows the story of Jagirdar (Jaber Khan) extending his oppression.

Cast
 Sultan Rahi - (Malanga)
 Anjuman
 Mustafa Qureshi - (Sher Khan)
 Afzaal Ahmad
 Nazli
 Tanzeem Hassan
 Shagufta - (Banoo)
 Zahir Shah
 Tariq Shah
 Altaf Khan
 Nasrullah Butt
 Seema Begum
 Nannha
 Ilyas Kashmiri - (Jabar Khan)
 Talish - (Dsp)
 Bahar
 Habib - (Malanga)
 Haq Nawaz
 Ali Nasir
 Saleem Hassan
 Raseela - (Munshi)
 Sajjad Kishwar

Music 
The film score was composed by Wajahat Attre and film song lyrics were written by Waris Ludhianvi.

References

External links 
 

1986 films
Pakistani action films
Punjabi-language Pakistani films
1980s Punjabi-language films